Christian County Public Schools is the public school system of Christian County, Kentucky, United States. After many of the high schools in the area were consolidated in 1959, the city and county schools were consolidated with the formation of the school district in 1971. As of the 2018–2019 year, there were 8219 students and 506 FTE classroom teachers.

There are eight elementary schools serving preschoolers through sixth graders, two middle schools serving seventh and eighth graders, and two high schools serving ninth through twelfth graders. There are also some alternative schools including a program for students in the Kentucky Department of Juvenile Justice system.

In August 2021, Christian County Public Schools Board voted to consolidate Christian County High School, Hopkinsville High School and Gateway Academy to a College & Career Academy High School (also named Hopkinsville–Christian County Academy) The planned opening of the school is the Fall semester of 2024, with Christian County High School and Hopkinsville High School closing the same semester.

Elementary
 Crofton Elementary School (Crofton)
 Freedom Elementary School (Hopkinsville), established 2015
 Indian Hills Elementary School (Hopkinsville)
 Martin Luther King, Jr. Elementary School (Hopkinsville)
 Millbrooke Elementary School (Hopkinsville)
 Pembroke Elementary School (Pembroke)
 Sinking Fork Elementary School (Hopkinsville)
 South Christian Elementary School (Herndon)

Middle
 Hopkinsville Middle School (Hopkinsville)
 Christian County Middle School (Hopkinsville)

High
 Christian County High School (Hopkinsville)
 Hopkinsville High School (Hopkinsville)
 Gateway Academy to Innovation and Technology (Hopkinsville)

Alternative 
 Bluegrass Learning Academy (Hopkinsville, grades 6–12)
 Christian County Day Treatment Center (Hopkinsville, grades 9–12)
 Cumberland Hall School at Cumberland Hall Hospital (Hopkinsville)
 Virtual Learning Academy (grades 4–12)

Former schools 
 Belmont Elementary School
 Building was completed in 1960
 closed in 2015
 Holiday Elementary School
 established in 1970
 closed in 2015
 Lacy Elementary School
 opened as Lacy School in 1939
 served as a high school with diplomas up to 1959
 school burned and was rebuilt twice: 1945 and 1971
 closed in 2015

References

External links
 

School districts in Kentucky
Education in Christian County, Kentucky